Aztlán is the sixth studio album by the Mexican rock band Zoé. The album was released on April 18, 2018 after a wait of over four years since their previous studio LP Prográmaton. Aztlán was produced by longtime Zoé producer Phil Vinall and Craig Silvey, collaborating with Zoé for the first time. Silvey's influence brought new sounds and recording techniques to this album and helped set it apart from Prográmaton. Lead singer León Larreguí has described the genre of the album as rock or rock-pop.

The name Aztlán refers to the mythical ancestral homeland of the Aztec or Mexica people, and according to Larreguí it was chosen out of pride for their Mexican culture. Larreguí has also described the "Aztlán" theme of the album as "an invitation to people to reflect on their own cultures and ideas." The album cover features an original oil painting by Larreguí, presumably depicting the departure of the Aztecs from Aztlán before founding the city of Tenochtitlán in the present day valley of Mexico City. Aztlán was included on Rolling Stone's list of 10 Best Latin Albums of 2018 and later went on to win the Grammy Award for Best Latin Rock, Urban or Alternative Album on February 10, 2019. Previously, the album had been nominated for the Latin Grammy Award for Best Alternative Music Album, but did not win. As a result, the Grammy win came as a complete surprise to the band, and they did not even attend the award ceremony, with the band members finding out about winning the award through tweets and chat messages.

Track listing

Singles
Five tracks have been released as singles: "Azul", "Temor y temblor", "Clarividad", "Hielo", and "No hay mal que no dure".

References

2018 albums
Grammy Award for Best Latin Rock, Urban or Alternative Album
Zoé albums